Zimba may refer to:

People
 Atongo Zimba (born 1967), a musician from Ghana
 Denis Zimba (born 1971), a Zambian boxer
 Denise Zimba (born 1988), a South African actress
 Lawrence Zimba (born 1955), a Zambian politician
 Neeraj Zimba (born 1981), an Indian Politician
 Yeshey Zimba (born 1952), a Bhutanese politician
 Zimba Tribe, a 16th-century African tribe who were reputed to be cannibals; see Mir Ali Beg

Places
 Zimba (mountain), in the Rätikon range, Austria
 Zimba, Zambia
 Zimba District, Zambia

Language
 Zimba language, a Bantu language of the Democratic Republic of the Congo
 Zemba language, a Bantu language spoken mainly in Angola

See also 
 
 Simba (disambiguation)
 Zumba (disambiguation)
 Zimbabwe, a country in southern Africa
Zambian surnames

Mozambican surnames